Anastasia Potapova and Yana Sizikova were the defending champions, but they decided not to participate this year. 

Susan Bandecchi and Simona Waltert won the title, defeating Ulrikke Eikeri and Valentini Grammatikopoulou in the final, 6–3, 6–7(3–7), [10–5]. This was this first WTA Tour doubles title won by both Bandecchi and Waltert.

Seeds

Draw

Draw

References
Main Draw

Ladies Open Lausanne - Doubles
WTA Swiss Open